Taeyang (Korean for "sun") is a South Korean singer.

Taeyang may also refer to:
Taeyang ("sun, Great Yang") in Traditional Korean medicine
TaeYang, doll 2003
Taeyangcho gochujang, Sun chilli paste

See also
Tae-yeon (name)